Karen Danczuk (née Burke) from Middleton, Rochdale is a British former local councillor for Kingsway, Rochdale metro. She came to prominence as the wife of Simon Danczuk, who was Member of Parliament for the Rochdale constituency from 2010 to 2017. In 2017, she applied to be a Labour MP.

Family
Karen and Simon Danczuk married in 2012. They have two sons. The couple separated in June 2015. In July 2015, he said that he had been suffering from depression caused by his campaigning work on child sexual abuse and that this had affected their marriage.

Television work
Danczuk took part in 2015 in the TV programme, NHS in Crisis: Live Debate and was a participant in 2016's Celebrity Island with Bear Grylls.
She has appeared on Loose Women several times.

She is a campaigner for victims of sexual abuse, and a patron for the National Association for People Abused in Childhood.

References

Year of birth missing (living people)
Living people
Councillors in Greater Manchester
Sexual abuse victim advocates
Women councillors in England
People from Middleton, Greater Manchester
Television personalities from Greater Manchester